Mazafati (or mozafati and Bam date; also called muzati in Balochi) is a cultivar of the palm date.

Areas of cultivation
It is grown in the region of southern Iran, mainly in Bam, Jiroft, Kahnuj (in Kerman province), Saravan, Nikshahr, Haji Abad, and Iranshahr (in Sistan-o-Baluchestan province), Panjgur, Parom and Buleda in Pakistani province of Balochistan.

It is estimated that Mazafati dates account for 20% of Iran’s total export of dates. Approximately 120,000 tons are harvested from the land annually. Mazafati date palms can stay in production for over 60 years.

Consumption
The date is suited for fresh consumption, i.e., not dried. At a temperature of  it can be kept for up to two years or at  it can be kept for one year. Mazafati date harvesting time depends on the variety and starts in August, lasting to the end of October.

This variety is the most common variety of fresh dates for snacking and table eating. It is a valuable source of nutritional elements for daily consumption as a fruit. It is rich in fiber content and vital elements.

Mazafati is a popular fruit for consumption in many countries. However, exports have been badly affected by international sanctions.

Content and nutrition 
 
Mazafati date seeds are made up of 7.7-9.7% oil and make up 5.6-14.2% of the date’s weight. They contain 7.17-9% moisture, 1.83-5.3% protein, 6.8-9.32% fat, 65.5% carbohydrates, 6.4-13.6% fiber, and 0.89-1.57% ash, as well as sterols, estrone, and an alkali-soluble polysaccharide. The fatty acids contained in the oil are 8% lauric, 4% myristic, 25% palmitic, 10% stearic, 45% oleic, and 10% linoleic acid, as well as some caprylic and capric acid.

The dates have nutrients including calcium, magnesium, potassium, vitamin A, vitamin B complex and vitamin C. Moreover, they are low in fat and high in fiber and protein content.

References

Date cultivars